Anolis wermuthi, Wermuth's anole, is a species of lizard in the family Dactyloidae. The species is found in Nicaragua and Honduras.

References

Anoles
Reptiles described in 1998
Reptiles of Nicaragua
Reptiles of Honduras
Taxa named by Gunther Köhler